The following is a list of United States ambassadors, or other chiefs of mission, to Uruguay. The current title given by the United States State Department to this position is Ambassador Extraordinary and Minister Plenipotentiary.

See also
United States – Uruguay relations
Foreign relations of Uruguay
Ambassadors of the United States

References

External links
 United States Department of State: Background notes on Uruguay
 United States Department of State: Chiefs of Mission for Uruguay
 United States Department of State: Uruguay
 United States Embassy in Montevideo

Uruguay
Main
United States